Double canon may refer to:

 Double canon in music, where it refers to a canon with two simultaneous themes
 Double canon in French typography, where it refers to 56-point type